Joceline Sanschagrin (born September 2, 1950) is a Canadian writer living in Quebec.

She was born in Montreal and studied French literature at the Collège Sainte-Marie de Montréal and the Cégep du Vieux Montréal. She went on to earn a bachelor's degree in communications from the Université du Québec à Montréal. Sanschagrin has worked as a freelance journalist, researcher and columnist for Le Journal de Montréal, La Presse, Radio-Québec, Radio-Canada, Télévision Quatre Saisons and Télé-Métropole. For 7 years, she was a daily contributor to the Radio-Canada youth program 275-Allô.

Sanschagrin wrote the text for several books featuring the character Caillou; Caillou, le petit pot and Caillou, la petite soeur, both published in 1993, received a Mr. Christie's Book Award in 1994. Some of her books have been translated into English, Korean, Spanish, Greek, Icelandic, Polish and Chinese.

Selected works 
 La fille aux cheveux rouges (1989), was a finalist for the Mr. Christie's Book Awards and for the Governor General's Literary Awards
 La marque du dragon (1999), was a finalist for the Mr. Christie's Book Awards

References 

1950 births
Living people
Canadian newspaper journalists
Canadian women children's writers
Writers from Quebec
Canadian children's writers in French
Canadian television journalists
20th-century Canadian women writers